Don Carlos Fernando Martínez de Irujo y McKean, 2nd Marquess of Casa Irujo, jure uxoris Duke of Sotomayor, Grandee of Spain (14 December 1802 in Washington, D.C. – 26 December 1855 in Madrid) was a Spanish noble and politician who served as Prime Minister of Spain. Additionally, he is a male line ancestor of the reigning duke of Alba.

Family
He was son of the diplomat Carlos Martínez de Irujo y Erice, 1st Marquess of Casa Irujo, and his wife Sarah McKean, the daughter of the Pennsylvania Governor and signer of the United States Declaration of Independence Thomas McKean and Pennsylvania First Lady Sarah Armitage McKean.

Don Carlos became a Grandee of Spain in 1844 through his marriage to Gabriela del Alcázar, 7th Duchess of Sotomayor through which he gained the courtesy title, Duke of Sotomayor.

The Duke and Duchess had two children:
 Carlos Martínez de Irujo y del Alcázar (3 April 1846 – 14 Sept 1909), 8th Duke of Sotomayor and 3rd Marquess of Casa Irujo
 María de la Piedad Martínez de Irujo y del Alcázar, married Pedro Caro y Széchényi, 6th Marquess de la Romana

References

|-

|-

|-

Prime Ministers of Spain
Dukes of Sotomayor
Marquesses of Spain
1802 births
1855 deaths
Moderate Party (Spain) politicians
19th-century Spanish politicians
Grandees of Spain
Spanish people of American descent
Spanish people of Irish descent
Knights of the Golden Fleece of Spain